Captain Charles John Cary, 9th Viscount Falkland (November 1768 – 2 March 1809) was a Scottish peer and Royal Navy officer.

Cary was the younger son of Lucius Cary, Master of Falkland and his wife Anne. He succeeded his elder brother Henry Cary, 8th Viscount Falkland in the peerage in 1796.

He commanded HMS Busy, which captured the San Telmo in the West Indies in 1801.

On 25 August 1802, he married Christiana Anton (d. 25 July 1822), by whom he had three sons and one daughter:
Lucius Cary, 10th Viscount Falkland (1803–1884)
Admiral Plantagenet Cary, 11th Viscount Falkland (1806–1886)
Capt. Hon. Byron Charles Ferdinand Plantagenet Cary, RN (5 October 1808 – 21 February 1874)
Hon. Emma Christiana Cary (d. 11 January 1827)

Cary reached the rank of post-captain in 1803. In 1807, while commanding HMS Quebec, Cary took the surrender of the Danish lieutenant commanding the garrison of Heligoland. However, he was dismissed from the ship shortly thereafter, having been convicted at a court-martial of drunkenness and ungentlemanlike behavior.

After a drunken quarrel with Arthur Annesley Powell, the two fought a duel on 28 February 1809, in which Falkland was shot through the groin and mortally wounded. He was taken back to Powell's house, where he died two days later. He was succeeded by his eldest son, Lucius Cary, 10th Viscount Falkland.

References

1768 births
1809 deaths
Royal Navy officers who were court-martialled
Earls in the Jacobite peerage
Viscounts Falkland
Royal Navy personnel of the Napoleonic Wars
British duellists
Duelling fatalities
Deaths by firearm in England
Charles